Michael Green (born 4 June 1954) is a Barbadian sailor. He competed at the 1988 Summer Olympics and the 1996 Summer Olympics, representing Barbados and Saint Lucia respectively.

References

External links
 

1954 births
Living people
Barbadian male sailors (sport)
Saint Lucian male sailors (sport)
Olympic sailors of Barbados
Olympic sailors of Saint Lucia
Sailors at the 1988 Summer Olympics – Star
Sailors at the 1996 Summer Olympics – Laser
Sportspeople from Dublin (city)